The Central District of Chabahar County is a district (bakhsh) in Chabahar County, Sistan and Baluchestan province, Iran. At the 2006 census, the district's population was 113,154, in 27,738 families. The district has one city: Chabahar. The district has two rural districts (dehestan): Kambel-e Soleyman Rural District and Vashnam-e Dari Rural District. At the 2016 census, the population had risen to 145,007.

References 

Chabahar County
Districts of Sistan and Baluchestan Province
Populated places in Chabahar County